The New York–New Jersey Harbor Estuary, also known as the Hudson-Raritan Estuary, is in the northeastern states of New Jersey and New York on the East Coast of the United States. The system of waterways of the Port of New York and New Jersey forms one of the most intricate natural harbors in the world and one of the busiest ports of the United States. The harbor opens onto the New York Bight in the Atlantic Ocean to the southeast and Long Island Sound to the northeast.

Although the overall form of the estuary remains unchanged from the time of Giovanni da Verrazzano's visit in 1524, all parts have changed at least a little, and some parts, such as Hell Gate and Ellis Island, have been almost completely altered. In some places this required blasting of bedrock.

There is an extremely complex system of tides and currents.  Both the Bight and the Sound are essentially marine bodies with tides and saltwater, but the Sound compared to the Atlantic is about 20–30% less saline (as an estuary), and the tide is about 3 hours later with as much as 70% more variation. Rivers add a fresher, non-tidal inflow although the tide and brackishness extend well up rivers throughout the extended hydrologic system from Albany to Montauk Point to the Hudson Canyon region of the New York Bight. The New York Harbor Observing and Prediction System (NYHOPS) utilizes information from sensors, weather forecasts, and environment models to provide real-time forecasts of meteorological and oceanographic conditions in the area.

Since the Ash Wednesday Storm of 1962 beaches along the shores of the East Coast have been regularly replenished with sand pumped in from off-shore. The United States Army Corps of Engineers (USACE) coordinates the projects. 

In 2016, USACE and the Port Authority of New York and New Jersey produced a comprehensive restoration plan for the New York Harbor region, with proposals to mitigate the effects of sea level rise through projects to restore natural areas. In September the USACE released the New York New Jersey Harbor and Tributaries Study (HATS).

Features of the harbor estuary

The lists below includes features of the Port of New York and New Jersey with a waterborne emphasis, starting with natural features. Where possible the list proceeds from the Lower Bay entrance approximately clockwise around the Harbor. The alternative sorting is by jurisdiction.

Official references are the NOAA Coastal pilot, NOAA nautical charts, and USGS topographic maps.
Many jurisdictional issues appear in U.S. law.

Rivers and streams
Bi-state
Hackensack River
Hudson River (lowest section also called the North River)

New Jersey

Berrys Creek
Dwars Kill
Elizabeth River
Overpeck Creek
Navesink River
Passaic River
First River (a.k.a. Mill Brook)
Second River
Third River
Rahway River
Raritan River
Shrewsbury River
Morses Creek
Piles Creek
Woodbridge River

New York

Alley Creek
Bronx River
Byram River
Coney Island Creek
Flushing River
Fresh Kills
Gerritsen Creek
Gowanus Canal (formerly Gowanus Creek)
Hawtree Creek
Hook Creek
Hutchinson River
Luyster Creek
Main Creek
Mamaroneck River
Mianus River
Newtown Creek
Dutch Kills
English Kills
Maspeth Creek
Whale Creek
Nissequogue River
Richmond Creek
Sherman Creek
Smith Creek
Springville Creek
Tibbetts Brook

Tidal straits
Inter-state
Arthur Kill
Kill Van Kull
Long Island Sound

New York

Bronx Kill
Buttermilk Channel
East River
Grass Hassock Channel
Harlem River
Hell Gate
The Narrows
Pumpkin Patch Channel
Rockaway Inlet
Spuyten Duyvil

Bays, inlets and coves
New York Bay
Lower New York Bay
Gravesend Bay
Great Hills Harbor
Jamaica Bay
Bergen Basin
Fresh Creek Basin
Grassy Bay
Head of Bay
Thurston Basin
Mill Basin
Norton Basin
Paerdegat Basin
Leonardo Harbor
Prince's Bay
Raritan Bay
Sandy Hook Bay
Rockaway Inlet
Dead Horse Bay
Sheepshead Bay
Upper New York Bay (New York Harbor)
Atlantic Basin
Communipaw
Erie Basin
Gowanus Bay
Harsimus Cove
John's Cove
Long Canal
Morris Canal Basin
Newark Bay
Weehawken Cove

East River

Bowery Bay
Bushwick Inlet
Flushing Bay
Little Bay
Hallets Cove
Newtown Creek
Powell's Cove
Wallabout Bay (Navy Yard Basin)
Westchester Creek

Long Island Sound

City Island Harbor
Eastchester Bay
Hempstead Harbor
Little Neck Bay
Manhasset Bay
Pelham Bay
Port Chester Harbor

Islands

Bi-state
Ellis Island—All of the landfill portion of Ellis Island beyond its 1834 waterfront is in Jersey City, New Jersey, as is all water surrounding Liberty and Ellis Islands. The original island is an exclave in New York State.
Liberty Island, exclave of New York within surrounding waters of Jersey City
Shooters Island at head of Kill Van Kull in Newark Bay, part in New Jersey and part in New York

New Jersey
Plum Island, Sandy Hook Bay
Robbins Reef

New York

Bronx County
Pelham Islands
 The Blauzes
 Chimney Sweeps Islands
 City Island
 Hart Island
 High Island
 Hunters Island
 Rat Island
 Travers Island
 Twin Island
 North Brother Island
 South Brother Island
 Rikers Island

Kings County
Long Island
Jamaica Bay islands
 The Canarsie Pol
 Ruffle Bar

New York County
Manhattan
Upper Bay islands
 Ellis Island
 Governors Island
 Liberty Island
East River islands
 Mill Rock Island
 Randalls and Wards Islands
 Roosevelt Island
 U Thant Island

Queens County
Long Island
Jamaica Bay islands
Rulers Bar Hassock

Richmond County
 Staten Island
 Hoffman Island (formerly "Orchard Shoals")
 Isle of Meadows
 Prall's Island
 Shooters Island
 Swinburne Island

Westchester County
Pelham Islands
 Davids Island
 Goose Island

Land features
New Jersey

Bergen Neck
Bergen Point
Constable Hook
Droyer's Point
Kearny Point
New Barbadoes Neck
Paulus Hook
Sandy Hook

New York

Coney Island (formerly an island)
Fort Washington Point
Red Hook
Rockaway Point
Rodman's Neck
Throgs Neck
Ward's Point
Willets Point

Banks and shoals

Lower Bay
East Bank
False Hook
Flynns Knoll
Old Orchard Shoal
Romer Shoal
West Bank

Upper Bay
Bay Ridge Flats
Dimond Reef
Gowanus Flats
Jersey Flats

East River
College Point Reef
Hog Back
Holmes Rock
Lawrence Point Ledge
Mill Rock
Rhinelander Reef
South Brother Ledge
 Ways Reef

Navigational channels

Lower Bay
Ambrose Channel
Atlantic Highland Anchorage
Chapel Hill South Channel
Coney Island Channel
Gravesend Bay Anchorage
Raritan Bay East Reach
Rockaway Inlet
Sandy Hook Channel
Swash Channel
Terminal Channel

Raritan Bay
Red Bank Reach
Great Beds Reach
Raritan Bay West Reach
Raritan River Cutoff
Perth Amboy Anchorage
South Amboy Reach
Seguine Point Bend
Ward Point Bend (East & West)
Ward Point Secondary Channel

Jamaica Bay
Beach Channel
Island Channel
Runway Channel

Arthur Kill
Fresh Kills Reach
Elizabeth Port Reach
Gulfport Reach
Outerbridge Reach
Port Reading Reach
Port Socony Reach
Pralls Island Reach
South of Shooters Island Reach
Tremley Point Reach

Newark Bay
Elizabeth Channel
Newark Bay Middle Reach
Newark Bay North Reach
Newark Bay South Reach
North of Shooters Island Reach
Port Newark Branch Channel
Port Newark Pierhead Channel
South Elizabeth Channel

Kill van Kull
Bergen East Point Reach
Bergen West Point Reach
Constable Hook Reach

Upper Bay
Anchorage Channel
Bayridge Channel
Buttermilk Channel
Claremont Terminal Channel
Port Jersey Channel
Greenville Channel
Pierhead Channel
Red Hook Channel
Red Hook Flats Anchorage

Hudson River
 Weehawken Edgewater Channel

East River
 East Channel
 South Brother Channel
 West Channel

Port facilities
One of the many duties of the Port Authority of New York and New Jersey is to develop trade interests in the New York-New Jersey area. The Port Authority operates most of the containerized port facilities listed here, and also collaborates with the Army Corps of Engineers to maintain shipping channels in the harbor.

New Jersey (numerous privately operated bulk facilities, especially petroleum, are not listed)
Auto Marine Terminal, Bayonne and Jersey City—Port Authority
Global Marine Terminal, Jersey City—privately operated
Port Jersey
Port Newark–Elizabeth Marine Terminal, Newark and Elizabeth—Port Authority

New York                                                         
Brooklyn
Red Hook Container Terminal—Port Authority
South Brooklyn Marine Terminal—City of New York
Staten Island
Howland Hook Marine Terminal—Port Authority

Lights and lighthouses
For lists see and. Active unless noted.

New Jersey

Conover Beacon (Chapel Hill Front Range)
Great Beds Light
Old Orchard Shoal Light
Robbins Reef Light
Romer Shoal Light
Sandy Hook Light
West Bank Light (Range Front)

New York

Ambrose Light
Lightship Ambrose (to Scotland Station, NJ, 1933; decommissioned 1968)
Blackwell Island Light (decommissioned 1934)
Coney Island Light (Nortons Point)
Execution Rocks Light
Fort Wadsworth Light (decommissioned 1965)
Jeffreys Hook Light
Kings Point Light
New Dorp Light (Swash Channel Range Rear, decommissioned 1964)
Prince's Bay Light (decommissioned 1922)
Staten Island Range Light
Statue of Liberty (discontinued 1902)
Stepping Stones Light
Throgs Neck Light
Whitestone Point Light

Waterfront jurisdictions

Government and other agencies
Immigration and Customs Enforcement
National Park Service
New Jersey Meadowlands Commission
Port Authority of New York and New Jersey
United States Army Corps of Engineers
United States Coast Guard
U.S. Customs and Border Protection
United States Park Police
Waterfront Commission of New York Harbor

State, county, municipal
New Jersey

Monmouth County
Waterwitch Highlands
Atlantic Highlands
Leonardo
Belford
Port Monmouth
Keansburg
Port Comfort
Union Beach
Keyport
Middlesex County
Laurence Harbor
Morgan
South Amboy
Perth Amboy
Sewaren
Port Reading
Chrome
Carteret
Union County
Tremley Point
Grasselli
Linden
Elizabeth
Elizabethport
Essex County
Newark
Hudson County
Bayonne
Port Johnson
Liberty State Park
Jersey City
Hoboken
Weehawken
West New York
North Bergen
Edgewater

New York

New York City
Manhattan, New York County
Brooklyn, Kings County
Floyd Bennett Field
Manhattan Beach
Brighton Beach
Coney Island
Gravesend
Bensonhurst
Fort Hamilton
Bath Beach
Bay Ridge
Red Hook
South Brooklyn
Brooklyn Heights
Queens, Queens County
Lower Bay
Far Rockaway
Rockaway Point
Breezy Point
East River
Flushing
Willets Point
La Guardia Airport
The Bronx, Bronx County
City Island
Staten Island, Richmond County
Port Richmond
Elm Park
Mariners Harbor
West New Brighton
Sailors Snug Harbor
New Brighton
Tottenville
Charleston
Port Socony
Travis
Chelsea
St. George
Tompkinsville

See also

 Marine life of New York–New Jersey Harbor Estuary
 New York Harbor Storm-Surge Barrier
 Newark Basin

References

External links
 New York-New Jersey Harbor Estuary Program, partnership to protect and restore the Harbor Estuary
 New York and New Jersey Harbor, US Army Corps of Engineers
 PANJNY Coastal Ecosystems Initiatives
  Video explaining formation of estuary
 EPA Water Quality
 New York–New Jersey Harbor/Urban Core

Port of New York and New Jersey
Geography of New York City
Geography of New Jersey
Estuaries of New Jersey
Estuaries of New York (state)